Okutanius kuroseanus is a species of sea snail, a marine gastropod mollusk in the family Fasciolariidae, the spindle snails, the tulip snails and their allies.

Description

Distribution
This marine species occurs off Japan.

References

 Okutani T. (1975). Glimpse of benthic molluscan fauna occupying the submarine bank, Kurose, near Hachijo Island, Japan. Venus. 33(4): 185-205, pls 8-10.
 Kosuge S. (1979) Report on the Mollusca on guyots from the Central Pacific collected by the 2nd and 3rd cruises of R/V Kaiyomaru in 1972 to 73 with descriptions of twelve new species. Bulletin of the Institute of Malacology, Tokyo 1(2): 24-35, pls 5-6.

External links
 Kantor Y.I., Fedosov A.E., Snyder M.A. & Bouchet P. (2018). Pseudolatirus Bellardi, 1884 revisited, with the description of two new genera and five new species (Neogastropoda: Fasciolariidae). European Journal of Taxonomy. 433: 1-57

 
Gastropods described in 1975